Alessandra Mariéthoz (born 6 April 1967) is a Swiss fencer. She competed in the women's individual foil event at the 1988 Summer Olympics.

References

External links
 

1967 births
Living people
Swiss female foil fencers
Olympic fencers of Switzerland
Fencers at the 1988 Summer Olympics